Eiriksson or Eiríksson is a surname that can refer to the following:

Magnús Eiríksson (1806-1881), Icelandic theologian
Harald Eiriksson, Earl of Orkney (1191–1194)
Eyvindur P. Eiríksson (born 1935), Icelandic writer
Håkon Eiriksson, Earl of Lade 
Leif Ericson (Old Norse: Leifr Eiríksson) ( 970 –  1020), a Norse explorer 
Thorvald Eriksson (Old Icelandic: Þorvaldr Eiríksson), the son of Erik the Red
Rögnvald Eriksson (or Ragnvald Eiriksson), a son of Erik Bloodaxe.

See also
Eriksen (surname)
Erikson